Matt Keith (born April 11, 1983) is a Canadian former professional ice hockey forward who last played and captained Braehead Clan of the Elite Ice Hockey League (EIHL). He previously played in the National Hockey League (NHL) with the Chicago Blackhawks and New York Islanders.

Playing career
Keith was drafted 59th overall in the 2001 NHL Entry Draft by the Chicago Blackhawks. He appeared in his first NHL game on February 24, 2004, against the Philadelphia Flyers.  On March 1 of that same year against the Nashville Predators, he scored his first goal.

On December 29, 2006, he was traded along with Sébastien Caron and Chris Durno to the Ducks in exchange for P. A. Parenteau and Bruno St. Jacques.

On January 9, 2008, he was traded to the Islanders from the Anaheim Ducks in exchange for Darryl Bootland. Keith appeared in 3 games with the Islanders upon the completion of the 2007–08 season. On July 25, 2008, Keith signed with German team ERC Ingolstadt of the DEL.

For the 2009–10 season Keith returned to North America signing with, the Rockford IceHogs of the AHL, affiliate of the Chicago Blackhawks. Scoring 21 goals in 69 games for the IceHogs, Keith was then signed to a one-year contract with fellow AHL team, the Abbotsford Heat, affiliate of the Calgary Flames on September 28, 2010.

After one season in Sweden with second division side, Örebro HK, Keith moved to the Czech Republic, signing a one-year free agent contract with HC Karlovy Vary on July 9, 2012. After only four games into the 2012–13 Czech Extraliga season, Keith left Karlovy to sign a try-out contract with Dornbirner EC of the Austrian Hockey League on October 8, 2012. He remained with the Bulldogs for the remainder of the year to total 28 points in 37 games.

Following three years in the UK with Braehead Clan, where Keith captained the team, the forward announced his departure from the EIHL in April 2017. He later announced his retirement from professional hockey after 14 seasons.

Career statistics

References

External links
 

1983 births
Abbotsford Heat players
Braehead Clan players
Bridgeport Sound Tigers players
Canadian ice hockey centres
Chicago Blackhawks draft picks
Chicago Blackhawks players
ERC Ingolstadt players
HC Karlovy Vary players
Living people
New York Islanders players
Norfolk Admirals players
Örebro HK players
Portland Pirates players
Red Deer Rebels players
Rockford IceHogs (AHL) players
EC Red Bull Salzburg players
Spokane Chiefs players
Ice hockey people from Edmonton
Canadian expatriate ice hockey players in the United States
Canadian expatriate ice hockey players in Scotland
Canadian expatriate ice hockey players in the Czech Republic
Canadian expatriate ice hockey players in Austria
Canadian expatriate ice hockey players in Germany
Canadian expatriate ice hockey players in Sweden